Hugh Gilchrist  (8 August 191616 October 2010) was an Australian public servant, diplomat and author.

Background and early career 
Born in Sydney on 8 August 1916, Gilchrist was educated at Cranbrook School and the University of Sydney. Following military service during World War II, he joined the Department of External Affairs in October 1945 as second secretary in the political intelligence section.

Career 
Whilst Australian Ambassador to Greece between 1968 and 1972, Gilchrist developed a fascination with Greek-Australian history. Whilst living in Athens, Gilchrist heard the story of Diamantina Bowen (née di Roma), a noblewoman from Greece and later the wife of the first Governor of Queensland, George Bowen. Gilchrist's commitment to Greece and the Greek people stayed with him into his retirement, when he began researching to write the three volume Australians and Greeks. The New South Wales Migration Heritage Centre described the trilogy as containing both "definitive history... and an entertaining array of colourful characters and stories".

In 1992, the first volume of Australians and Greeks was published, The Early Years. The second volume, The Middle Years, followed in 1997. In 1998, Gilchrist was awarded the Gold Cross of St Andrew by the Greek Archdiocese of Sydney. Volume III, The Later Years, was issued in 2004.

Also during retirement Gilchrist spent four years on the Literature Board of the Australia Council for the Arts. Gilchrist died on 16 October 2010.

Works

Awards
National Heritage Trust Award (1994)
Gold Cross of St Andrew (1998)
Medal of the Order of Australia (2005)

References

1916 births
2010 deaths
Australian writers
Ambassadors of Australia to Greece
Ambassadors of Australia to Spain
High Commissioners of Australia to Tanzania
Recipients of the Medal of the Order of Australia
People educated at Cranbrook School, Sydney